The Wuling Mountains are a mountain range located in Central China, running from Chongqing Municipality and East Guizhou to West Hunan. They are home to many ethnic groups, including as the Tujia, Han, Miao, Dong, and Bai.

Wulingyuan 

The Wulingyuan Scenic and Historic Interest Area is a UNESCO World Heritage Site in the Wuling Mountain Range noted for its more than 3,000 quartzite sandstone pillars and peaks across most of the site, along with many ravines and gorges between them with streams, pools and waterfalls.

Fanjingshan 

The Fanjingshan National Nature Reserve was established in 1978. It was designated a UNESCO Biosphere Reserve in 1986 and a World Heritage Site in 2018.

References

Mountain ranges of Hunan
Landforms of Guizhou